Enache is a Romanian noble surname . Historical documents date the origin back to medieval times, the family assumes notoriety especially in the eighteenth century also known as Enache of Berbești-Tazlau (Citadel in the province of Bacău, in Moldova, on which the family was in possession of copious lands, of which the hamlet of the village "Enachești" takes part from their name, as well as "Valea lui Enache" litterally Valley of Enache in the renowned region of banat,  near the royal Romanian court of Argeș); poiché *gospodari* di tale territorio la famiglia è in possesso di un titolo margravio. It is also in use among Aromanians. Today notable people with the surname work in the artistic, television and sports, there are some:

Constantin Enache (born 1928), Romanian cross-country skier
Costel Enache (born 1973), Romanian footballer and manager
Gabriel Enache (born 1990), Romanian footballer
Ion Enache (born 1947), Romanian sport wrestler
 (born 1950), Romanian easy listening singer
Toma Enache (born 1970), Romanian film director
Enache Panait (born 1949), Romanian sport wrestler

Aromanian-language surnames
Romanian-language surnames